Pradyut Kumar Bhattacharya (3 November 1913 - 12 January 1933) was a Bengali revolutionary and activist of the Indian freedom movement. He was hanged in Midnapore Central jail.

Revolutionary activities
Bhattacharya was born in Midnapore, British India. His father's name was Bhabataran Bhattacharya. He joined in the anti-British movement and Jugantar group while studying in Midnapore College. The revolutionaries of the Bengal Volunteers decided to assassinate ruthless Second magistrate Robert Doglas because he was responsible for killing two unarmed activists in Hijli Detention Camp. On 30 April 1932, Prabhanshu Sekhar Pal and Bhattacharya fired on the magistrate while he was presiding over a meeting of the Zilla District Board. Pal escaped but Bhattacharya was caught on the spot with the revolver. Pradyot did not utter any name in spite of severe torture by the police.

Death
On 12 January 1933 Bhattacharya was executed by hanging in Medinipur Central Jail but Prabhanshu remained untraced.

References

1913 births
1933 deaths
Executed revolutionaries
Revolutionary movement for Indian independence
Indian nationalism
Indian people convicted of murder
Indian revolutionaries
Executed Indian people
20th-century executions by the United Kingdom
People executed by British India by hanging
People from Paschim Medinipur district
Revolutionaries from West Bengal
Indian independence activists from West Bengal